Ketumadi Toungoo Yazawin is a Burmese chronicle that covers the history of Toungoo from 1279 to 1613. An 1837 palm-leaf manuscript copy of an earlier copy has survived. The chronicle only provides a brief summary of early rulers. A more detailed account of later rulers begins with the reign of Min Sithu of Toungoo (r. 1481–1485), suggesting that the chronicle was first compiled in the late 15th century.

See also
 List of rulers of Toungoo

References

Bibliography
 
 
 

Burmese chronicles